Oak Grove is a historic home located near Erwin in Harnett County and Cumberland County, North Carolina. It was built about 1764, and is a two-story, five bay by two bay, Georgian frame dwelling.  It has a full-width front porch and shed roofed wings.  During the American Civil War, in March, 1865, the Battle of Averasborough was fought on the grounds of Oak Grove.

It was listed on the National Register of Historic Places in 1973.

References

Houses on the National Register of Historic Places in North Carolina
Georgian architecture in North Carolina
Houses completed in 1764
Houses in Cumberland County, North Carolina
National Register of Historic Places in Cumberland County, North Carolina
1764 establishments in North Carolina